Over the Santa Fe Trail is a 1947 American Western film directed by Ray Nazarro and written by Louise Rousseau. The film stars Ken Curtis, Jennifer Holt, Guy Kibbee, Guinn "Big Boy" Williams, Noel Neill and Holmes Herbert. The film was released on February 13, 1947, by Columbia Pictures.

Plot

Cast          
Ken Curtis as Curt Mason
Jennifer Holt as Carolyn
Guy Kibbee as Biscuits
Guinn "Big Boy" Williams as Big Boy Jackson
Noel Neill as Taffy Neill
Holmes Herbert as Doc Henderson
Babette De Castro as Singer 
Cherie De Castro as Singer 
Peggy De Castro as Singer
Art West as Art West
Paul Trietsch as Hot Shot Hezzie 
Ken Trietsch as Hot Shot Ken 
Gil Taylor as Hot Shot Bass Player 
Charles Ward as Hot Shot Gabe

References

External links
 

1947 films
1940s English-language films
American Western (genre) films
1947 Western (genre) films
Columbia Pictures films
Films directed by Ray Nazarro
American black-and-white films
1940s American films